European route E 584 is a European B class road in Romania, Moldova and Ukraine, connecting the cities Poltava and Slobozia, Romania. This route was previously numbered as E577.

Route 
 
 :  Poltava (E85) - Oleksandriia 
 : Oleksandriia - Znamianka - Kropyvnytskyi
 : Kropyvnytskyi (E50/E471) - Platonove
 
 : Dubău - Chișinău
 : Chișinău - Giurgiulești
 
 : Galați - Brălia (concurrent with E87)
 : Brălia - Slobozia

External links 
 UN Economic Commission for Europe: Overall Map of E-road Network (2007)
 International E-road network

Roads in Romania
Roads in Moldova
European routes in Ukraine